The 2013–14 season was the 14th year of continuous activity of the Maastricht association football club MVV Maastricht in the Jupiler League. MVV Maastricht regularly played its home games on Friday evenings at 8:00 PM.

Technical staff and selection

Technical staff

Selection

Transfers

2013–14 season matches

2013–14 season practice matches

2013–14 season league matches

2013–14 cup matches

2013–14 season competition results 
MVV Maastricht lost the opening matches of the new season again FC Dordrecht. The team won its next match, against FC Tweede Jong.

External links
 Official website
 Official Supporter's club of MVV Maastricht
 Jupiler League Team page

MVV Maastricht
Mvv Maastricht